Łukasz Przybytek (born May 20, 1989 in Lipno) is a Polish sailor. He competed with Pawel Kolodzinski in the 49er class at the 2012 and 2016 Olympics, finishing in 13th and 8th place respectively.

References

External links
 
 
 

Polish male sailors (sport)
1989 births
Living people
Olympic sailors of Poland
Sailors at the 2012 Summer Olympics – 49er
People from Lipno, Lipno County
Sportspeople from Kuyavian-Pomeranian Voivodeship
Sailors at the 2016 Summer Olympics – 49er
Sailors at the 2020 Summer Olympics – 49er